María del Pino y Calvo-Sotelo (born 1956/57) is a Spanish billionaire, and the eldest child of the late billionaire Rafael del Pino y Moreno, who founded Ferrovial.

References

1950s births
Living people
Female billionaires
Spanish billionaires
20th-century Spanish businesswomen
20th-century Spanish businesspeople
21st-century Spanish businesswomen
21st-century Spanish businesspeople